A list of films produced in Argentina in 1945:

External links and references
 Argentine films of 1945 at the Internet Movie Database

1945
Films
Argentine